The 2012 Arab Cup U-17 was an association football tournament between Arabic countries played in July 2012 and hosted in Tunisia.

Participants 

 and  withdrew from the tournament

Group stage

Group A

Group B

 withdrew from the tournament.

Group C

 withdrew from the tournament

Knockout stage

Semifinals

Third place playoff

Final

Winners

Award winners
Fair play Award: 
Best player:  Sherko Kareem Lateef
Top goal scorer (Golden Boot):   Sherko Kareem Lateef (7 goals)

References

External links 
Under 17 Arab Championship (Tunisia 2012) – goalzz.com

Arab Cup U-17
Arab Cup U-17
Arab Cup U-17
Arab Cup U-17
2012